Regner Olaf "Jack" Cummings  (8 May 1901 – 22 January 1972) was an Australian tennis player.

Cummings finished runner-up to Jean Borotra at the Australian Championships, the future Australian Open, in 1928. He also reached the semifinals in 1931 and the quarterfinals in 1930. Cummings won the Queensland Championships in 1926 and 1930.

Cummings turned professional in late 1935.

Grand Slam finals

Singles (1 runner-up)

References

External links

Australian male tennis players
1901 births
1972 deaths
Tennis people from New South Wales
Professional tennis players before the Open Era
20th-century Australian people